"I Remember" is a song by Canadian electronic music composer Deadmau5 and American DJ Kaskade. It was produced by Deadmau5, co-written by Kaskade with Finn Bjarnson and features vocals by Haley Gibby. It was released as the fifth single from Deadmau5's third studio album, Random Album Title, on 15 September 2008.

Music video 
There are two video versions, a 10-minute short film and an edited 4-minute version. It was produced by Anthony and Christopher Donnelly of Mancunian Gio-Goi fame and Mike Moran from Mojofuel. The video was directed by Colin O'Toole, cast by Graeme Brown, and stars British actor Stephen Graham, Warren Brown, Aston Kelly (Graham's brother), Greg Costello, and Coronation Street actress Emma Edmondson. It was filmed in Manchester and features Graham's character talking to two young men (Brown & Kelly) about life and rave culture. The young men then proceed to find a suitable venue for what is later revealed to be an illegal rave with Deadmau5 performing as the DJ.

The video features a raver (Costello) wearing a Kaskade t-shirt, and Deadmau5 wearing a YourOwnClothing t-shirt. At the end of the video, the Deadmau5 song "Brazil (2nd edit)" is mixed in as an outro. Graham was almost arrested after police mistook the video for a genuine illegal rave. The video also ends with a "to be continued" title card but no video appears to have been designated as the plot continuation.

The audio-only version upload on September 19, 2008 onto the Ultra Music YouTube channel has been played 78.3 million times as of March 2023.

Appearances 
The song appears in the 2010 video games GoldenEye 007 and DJ Hero 2. A remix of "I Remember" by FreeStyleGames was included in the DJ Hero 2 soundtrack. This version was also featured in GoldenEye 007.

"I Remember" was also featured on the soundtrack of the 2011 film The Lincoln Lawyer. The song can be heard during the film when Jesus Martínez, played by Michael Peña, explains his version of the events which occurred on the night of Donna Rentería's murder.

This song is also featured in the television series Gossip Girl episode "The Empire Strikes Jack" (Season 3 episode 16).  The song, being played by Deadmau5 himself, appears in the scene of Eleanor Waldorf's pop up fashion show.

Large sections of "I Remember" were sampled by hip-hop duo Suicideboys on their song "Antarctica", from their 2016 EP Dark Side of the Clouds. Deadmau5 publicly lamented the duo for this on Twitter, claiming that Suicideboys were "publicizing other people's intellectual property without consent." "Antarctica", which had been out since January and subsequently reached millions of plays on both YouTube and SoundCloud, was taken down by Suicideboys on both platforms and no further action was taken. Antarctica was reuploaded to Spotify and YouTube in late 2021, with Deadmau5 getting considerable publishing credits.

Impact and legacy
In 2022, American magazine Rolling Stone ranked "I Remember" number 149 in their list of 200 Greatest Dance Songs of All Time.

Track listings

Strobelite Edit 
Kaskade released an edit of the song on his Strobelite Seduction album.

Charts performance 
In the United Kingdom, the single charted and peaked at number 14 on the UK Singles Chart on 17 May 2009. It spent a total of nine weeks in the top 40 chart. The song has since been certified silver by the British Phonographic Industry (BPI) for sales of 200,000 units. In the summer of 2009, the single was regularly played in UK clubs, especially in bigger clubs in London. In the United States, it reached number one on Billboards Hot Dance Airplay chart on the issue dated 17 October 2009 giving the duo their second consecutive number one together, following "Move for Me" (2008).

Weekly charts

Year-end charts

Certifications

References

External links 
 

2008 songs
2009 singles
Deadmau5 songs
Kaskade songs
Songs written by Deadmau5
Songs written by Finn Bjarnson
Songs written by Kaskade
Ultra Music singles
Virgin Records singles